The 1953–54 season was the 52nd in the history of the Western Football League.

The champions for the first time in their history were Weymouth Reserves, and the winners of Division Two were Bristol Rovers Colts.

Division One
Division One was increased from seventeen members to eighteen after two clubs were promoted to replace Paulton Rovers who were relegated to Division Two.

Ilfracombe Town, runners-up in Division Two
Poole Town, third in Division Two

Division Two
Division Two remained at eighteen clubs after Ilfracombe Town and Poole Town were promoted to Division One. Two new clubs joined:

Paulton Rovers, relegated from Division One.
Poole Town Reserves, rejoining after leaving the league in 1928.

References

1953-54
4